Tangomagia is an annual international Tango-event in Amsterdam, occurring between Christmas and New Year's Eve, from 27 to 30 December.

Program 
The festival has workshops, the tango-café and the milongas. There is a possibility to follow workshops from the Argentinian maestros. Every afternoon from 16:00 till 20:00 hours there is a tango-café where people can dance on the music of a DJ. In the evenings from  22 - 1 or 3 o'clock there are milongas with performances of the maestros, with live-music most of the time. The music style is traditional tango; no fusion or neo-tango. Every-day there is an "after party" from 3 - 7 so that the visitors have the opportunity to return home by train. For some visitors this is a good alternative for a visit to the Mecca of tango; Buenos Aires. The entrance is limited to a few hundred visitors. Most of them come to dance, only a few are just watching.

In 2013, in cooperation with the Muziekgebouw aan 't IJ, there is one evening where non-dancers can visit the festival. During the concert of Sexteto Silencio, there is an opportunity to enjoy the music. The concert is promoted by the Muziekgebouw.

Locations 
In 2005 they used "Crea" for the workshops, "Muziekgebouw aan het IJ",  "De Duif" (a church) and "Hotel Arena" for the milongas. In previous years they also used the Beurs van Berlage and "Meervaart".

In 2013, the festival starts in "De Kompaszaal" and has a main evening in "Het Muziekgebouw aan het IJ". The heart of the festival is "Dansmakers aan het IJ" in the former Kromhout plant. The final evening will be in "De Duif".

Visitors 
Visitors come from countries like:
The Netherlands, Belgium, Germany, France, England, Norway, Sweden, Denmark, Russia, Switzerland, Spain, Italy, Canada, United States, Japan, Taiwan, Indonesia, Turkey, Israel, Egypt, Morocco, Argentina, Colombia and possibly more. A quarter of the visitors are Dutch. The conversation language is English.

History 
In 1997 was the first Tangomagia festival. Due to the great financial losses of the organizing foundation in 2011 and 2012 (Stichting Zandunga) a bankruptcy was declared on June 3, 2014. Thanks to financial rescue management, the 2013 edition was the last edition. After this, in 2015 the Dutch International Tangoweek foundation was founded to create a non-profit and independent organisation to promote the Argentine Tango in The Netherlands.

External links
 site of the organisation
 Site van de Dutch International Tangoweek

Tango in the Netherlands
Culture in Amsterdam